The 1996 Rado Open, also known as the Swiss Open,  was a men's tennis tournament played on outdoor clay courts at the Roy Emerson Arena in Gstaad, Switzerland and was part of the World Series of the 1996 ATP Tour. It was the 51st edition of the tournament and was held from 8 July until 14 July 1996. Albert Costa won the singles title.

Finals

Singles

 Albert Costa defeated  Félix Mantilla 4–6, 7–6(7–2), 6–1, 6–0
 It was Costa's 1st title of the year and the 2nd of his career.

Doubles

 Jiří Novák /  Pavel Vízner defeated  Trevor Kronemann /  David Macpherson 4–6, 7–6, 7–6
 It was Novák's 3rd title of the year and the 5th of his career. It was Vízner's 3rd title of the year and the 3rd of his career.

External links
 Official website  
 Official website 
 Official website 
 ATP Tournament Profile

Rado Open
Swiss Open (tennis)